Katarzyna Wilkos (born 10 August 1993) is a Polish professional racing cyclist, who rides for UCI Women's Continental Team . She rode in the women's road race at the UCI Road World Championships in 2015, 2018, 2019 and 2020.

Major results
Source: 

2015
 2nd Road race, National Road Championships
2018
 3rd Time trial, National Road Championships
2019
 1st Kyivska Sotka Women Challenge
 4th Overall Tour de Feminin-O cenu Českého Švýcarska
1st  Points classification
1st Stage 4
 4th Pannonhalma, V4 Ladies Series
 10th VR Women ITT
2020
 2nd Road race, National Road Championships

References

External links

1993 births
Living people
Polish female cyclists
People from Leżajsk County
European Games competitors for Poland
Cyclists at the 2019 European Games
21st-century Polish women